Elizabeth Capell, Countess of Essex (1704 – 8 June 1784) was the second wife of William Capell, 3rd Earl of Essex, and the mother of William Anne Capell, 4th Earl of Essex.

Lady Elizabeth was the daughter of Wriothesley Russell, 2nd Duke of Bedford.

The earl, whose first wife Jane had died in 1724, married Elizabeth on 3 February 1726.

They had two sons and two daughters. The only one to survive infancy was William Anne (1732-1799), who would become the 4th Earl.

She died in June 1784, aged about eighty.

A portrait of the countess by Andrea Soldi is held by Watford Museum.

References

1704 births
1784 deaths
English countesses
Russell family
Capell family
18th-century English nobility
18th-century English women
Daughters of British dukes